The Afro-American Museum of Pompano Beach was a museum that was located at 295 NW Sixth St., Pompano Beach, Florida. It operated from 1983 to 1985, but closed because of lack of community support. It was founded and run by Karl Weaver.

References

Museums in Pompano Beach, Florida
African-American history of Florida
Defunct museums in Florida
Pompano Beach, Florida
Buildings and structures in Pompano Beach, Florida
1983 establishments in Florida
1985 disestablishments in Florida
African-American museums in Florida